South Jordan Parkway station is a light rail station in the Daybreak community in South Jordan, Utah, United States, served by the Red Line of the Utah Transit Authority's (UTA) TRAX light rail system. The Red Line provides service from the University of Utah to the Daybreak community.

Description 
The station is located at 10605 South Grandville Avenue (5600 West). Since its construction, the station has only been accessible from the southwest end of West South Jordan Parkway, but with continued construction of the Mountain View Corridor (SR-85), it will eventually be accessible via the Mountain View Corridor/West South Jordan Parkway interchange just to the southwest. When the station was constructed, there was almost nothing in its immediate vicinity.  The station has a free Park and Ride lot with 200 parking spaces available, but there are plans for a total of about 400 parking spaces. In the early planning stages, the station was referred to as "Daybreak North Station", but later changed to the current name. The station is part of a railway right of way that was created specifically for the southwestern end of the Red Line. The station opened August 7, 2011, as part of the Red Line (Mid-Jordan) and is operated by the Utah Transit Authority.

References 

TRAX (light rail) stations
Railway stations in Salt Lake County, Utah
Railway stations in the United States opened in 2011
2011 establishments in Utah